Ultimate Alternative Wavers is the debut studio album by American indie rock band Built to Spill.  The line-up consisted of Doug Martsch on guitar and vocals, Brett Netson on guitar and bass, and Ralf Youtz on drums, although there was some variation in instrumentation on a few tracks.  The album was recorded at Audio Lab in Boise, Idaho, in the fall of 1992, and released in 1993 on C/Z Records. It was re-released in late 2006.

The song title "Nowhere Nothin' Fuckup" is the title of a song by the main character, Jason Taverner, in Philip K. Dick's Flow My Tears, the Policeman Said. The song's lyrics, also, are in large part borrowed from The Velvet Underground's "Oh! Sweet Nuthin'".

Personnel
Built to Spill

 Doug Martsch – lead and backing vocals, lead and rhythm guitars
 Brett Netson – bass, guitar, backing vocals
 Ralf Youtz –  drums, percussion

Additional Personnel

Todd Dunnigan - organ, keyboards on "The First Song," "Shameful Dread," "Hazy," and "Built Too Long"
James Dillon - piano on "Lie for a Lie"
Jake Carpenter - violin on "Built Too Long, pt. 2"

Track listing

Samples credits 
"Shameful Dread"

 The Simpsons dialogue, "Marge Gets a Job"

"Built Too Long"

 "Rebel Without a Pause" by Public Enemy

References 

Built to Spill albums
1993 debut albums
C/Z Records albums
Fire Records (UK) albums